REACT (Radio Emergency Associated Communication Teams) began as a CB radio Emergency Channel 9 monitoring organization across the United States and Canada in 1962. Initially, the primary role of REACT volunteers was to monitor Channel 9, the CB Emergency Channel, to help motorists. Later, duties grew to include communications after disasters (such as tornadoes and floods), and in some places before disasters (storm spotting). As well, REACT safety communications for parades, runs/walks and other community events became prominent. Now, REACT Teams barely use CB primarily, a large percentage have now added amateur, FRS, GMRS, Multi-Use Radio Service (MURS), Trunked radio systems and business band radio (LMR) to their public service capabilities. Their original purpose, to monitor CB, has largely gone by the wayside.

Services Provided 
Each REACT Team is unique and fills a local purpose. The original purpose of monitoring Emergency Channel 9 for distress calls is not as needed as it once was, due to the increased availability of cellular phones, but this task is still performed in some remote locations. Some teams disbanded when the need for CB 9 monitoring waned; however, other Teams became creative and found other things to do in their communities.       

Many REACT Teams go beyond just communications and provide services such as traffic and parking control, search and rescue support, assistance with large public events, helping with safety breaks along roadways, help monitor traffic flow, assist with their local emergency management offices, law enforcement and also some participate in the Skywarn program of storm spotters. However many of these functions require the mobile communications that many REACT Teams utilize.

Objectives 
(a) To develop the use of the personal radio services as an additional source of communications for emergencies. disasters, and as an emergency aid to individuals;
(b) To establish 24-hour volunteer monitoring of emergency calls, particularly over officially designated emergency frequencies, from personal radio service operators, and reporting such calls to appropriate emergency authorities;
(c) To promote transportation safety by developing programs that provide information and communications assistance to motorists;
(d) To coordinate efforts with and provide communication help to other groups, e.g., Red Cross, Emergency Management, and local, state, and federal authorities, during emergencies and disasters;
(e) To develop, administer, and promote public information projects demonstrating and publicizing the potential benefits and the proper use of the personal radio service to individuals, organizations, industry, and government; and
(f) To participate in citizens crime prevention programs where established by appropriate law enforcement agencies.

History 

1962 - A sick infant, a disabled car on a Chicago freeway, and a January blizzard prompted Henry B. (Pete) Kreer to envision using CB radio to get help in such emergencies. By April, REACT was founded, with Hallicrafters Radio as its first sponsor and Kreer as its executive director.

1967 - REACT approached FCC for a designated CB Emergency Channel.

1969 - REACT gained General Motors Research Labs as its new sponsor.

1970 - CB-9 was designated the 'Emergency and Travelers' Assistance Channel' by the FCC. The Ohio REACT Network was created. It worked with Ohio State Police to demonstrate how CB-9 could enhance highway safety. It later became the first REACT Council.
REACT signed its first MOU (Memorandum of Understanding) with the American Red Cross.

1973 - REACT's Pete Kreer and Jerry Reese were interviewed on the NBC 'Today' show about the potential for highway safety of CB radio.

1975 - REACT became an Illinois not-for-profit corporation.

1976 - REACT held its first convention in Deerfield, Ill. REACT participated in the White House Conference on CB Radio.

1977 - REACT launched its highway Safety Break program in cooperation with the American Trucking Association. REACT developed the NEAR (National Emergency Aid Radio) safety program for the U.S. government.

1978 - REACT signed an MOU with Special Olympics.

1982 - REACT was honored with the first President's Volunteer Action Award (16 awarded out of 2300 nominations).

1984 - REACT assisted in introducing FRS (Family Radio Service).

1985 - REACT office moved from Chicago, Ill., to Wichita, Kans.

1986 -'REACT Month' was observed for the first time.

1988 - REACT developed its 'Team Topics' newsletter for Teams.
REACT introduced the CB-9 road sign to advise travelers of monitoring.

1991 - REACT published the first in a series of 'Team Training Modules' to advance its monitors' skills.

1993 - REACT agreed to Memorandums of Understanding with the American Red Cross, Salvation Army, and National Weather Service.

1994 - Dallas County REACT, at HamCom in Arlington, Tex., became the fourth local group to host remote operation of the ARRL's station W1AW.

1995 - REACT HQ established its first website on the Internet.
Rose City Windsor REACT, Ontario, launched the first REACT Team website.
Several Teams responded to and assisted with the response to the bombing of the Alfred P Murrah Building (Oklahoma City Bombing).

1998 - REACT moved its headquarters from Wichita, Kans., to the D.C. area. REACT Teams in Florida respond to wildfires, receive recognition from governor. 

2001 - Several Teams assisted the Salvation Army in response to the World Trade Center attacks in New York City.
REACT agreed to Memorandum of Understanding with the American Radio Relay League (ARRL).

2002 - REACT assisted with Olympic Torch Run.
REACT presented the first "Radio Hero Award" to an Indiana State Trooper.

2004 - Dallas County REACT was again selected to host ARRL station W1AW at HamCom in Arlington, Texas.

2010 - REACT moved its headquarters from Suitland, Md., to Dinwiddie, Va.
REACT joins GERC - Global Emergency Radio Coalition - as a Charter Member.

2011 - REACT Announced 50th Anniversary Logo and 2012 Convention Site at Las Vegas, Nev.
For the third time, Dallas County REACT hosted ARRL station W1AW at HamCom in Plano, Texas.
REACT Teams involved in response to Hurricane Irene and Hurricane Lee.

2012 - REACT official office returned to Chicago; administrative office moved to Glendale, Calif.

References

External links
REACT International, Inc. Official Website

Tay Valley 6085 REACT UK

Amateur radio emergency communications organizations
Emergency communication